Ottinger is a surname derived from the city of Oettingen in Bavaria. 

Ottinger may refer to:
 Albert Ottinger, New York politician of the Republican Party
 Ferenc Ottinger (1792-1869), Hungarian general in the 1848-49 Revolution
 Friedrich Christoph Oetinger (1702-1782), German theosophist
 George M. Ottinger (1833-1917), American artist
 Günther Oettinger (born 1953), German politician
 Howard G. Ottinger (1888-1964), American businessman, farmer, and politician
 Konrad Öttinger (born 1530), Reformation-era German Protestant theologian
 L. D. Ottinger, former NASCAR driver
 Leonora von Ottinger, American actress
 Richard Ottinger, American politician of the Democratic Party, a former member of the United States House of Representatives, and a legal educator
 Ulrike Ottinger, German filmmaker

See also 

 Köstinger